In agriculture, a field is an area of land, enclosed or otherwise, used for agricultural purposes such as cultivating crops or as a paddock or other enclosure for livestock.  A field may also be an area left to lie fallow or as arable land.

Many farms have a field border, usually composed of a strip of shrubs and vegetation, used to provide food and cover necessary for the survival of wildlife. It has been found that these borders may lead to an increased variety of animals and plants in the area, but also in some cases a decreased yield of crops.

Paddock
 

In Australian and New Zealand English, any agricultural field may be called a paddock, especially if for keeping sheep or cattle. If stock are grazed there, the space may be called a run, e.g. sheep run; cattle run. The term paddock is used more specifically in animal husbandry for a system in which grazing land is divided into small areas, paddocks, and the stock graze each paddock in turn for a short period. Paddock grazing systems may be designed with, for example, 6 or 11 paddocks used in rotation.

A paddock is normally fenced, usually by wire, and often defined by its natural boundaries, or is otherwise considered distinct. A back paddock is a smaller field that is situated away from the farm house; possibly land of lesser quality.  The equivalent concept in North America and the UK is a pasture.

In Australia the word seems to have had its current meaning since at least 1807 and in New Zealand since at least 1842. However, the English meaning of "field" was used earlier in Australia and is still occasionally used. Similarly, meadow was in early use and has appeared later, for example, in 2004. Field remains in regular use in Australasia in expressions such as football field, Field Day and field trip.

In a new style of intensive farming developed in North America, a paddock is a small (perhaps 1 acre) temporary subdivision of a pasture made with electric fencing, which is intensely grazed for a day and then left to rest for perhaps 80 days or more.

Image gallery

See also

 Acre
 Coastal plain
 Flooded grasslands and savannas
 Flood-meadow
 Grassland
 Hectare
 Meadow
 Morgen
 Paddy field
 Pasture
 Plain
 Plateau
 Prairie
 Savanna
 Steppe
 Veld
 Vineyard
 Water-meadow
 Wet meadow

References

Agricultural land